Calcium-activated potassium channel subunit beta-2 is a protein that in humans is encoded by the KCNMB2 gene.

Big Potassium (BK) channels are large conductance, voltage and calcium-sensitive potassium channels which are fundamental to the control of smooth muscle tone and neuronal excitability. BK channels can contain two distinct subunits: a pore-forming alpha subunit and a modulatory beta subunit. Each complete BK channel contains four copies of the pore-forming alpha subunit and up to four beta subunits. The protein encoded by the KCNMB2 gene is an auxiliary beta subunit which influences the calcium sensitivity of BK currents and, following activation of BK current, causes persistent inactivation. The subunit encoded by the KCNMB2 gene is expressed in various endocrine cells, including pancreas and adrenal chromaffin cells. It is also found in the brain, including the hippocampus. The KCNMB2 gene is homologous to three other genes found in mammalian genomes: KCNMB1 (found primarily in smooth muscle), KCNMB3, and KCNMB4 (the primary brain BK auxiliary subunit).

Calcium-activated potassium channel subunit beta-2 comprises two domains. An N-terminal cytoplasmic domain, the ball and chain domain, which is responsible for the fast inactivation of these channels, and a C-terminal calcium-activated potassium channel beta subunit domain. The N-terminal domain only occurs in calcium-activated potassium channel subunit beta-2, while the C-terminal domain is found in related proteins.

See also
 BK channel
 Voltage-gated potassium channel

References

Further reading

External links
 
 

Protein domains
Ion channels